Anatoma japonica is a species of minute sea snail, a marine gastropod mollusk or micromollusk in the family Anatomidae.

Description
The length of the shell varies between 1 mm and 2.5 mm. It has a trochiform shell. The spire contains 3½ rather convex whorls. They are finely decussate by elevated longitudinal striae and close striae. The longitudinal striae are flexuous at the base. The aperture is subcircular. The outer lip is dilated  and reflexed in the middle.

Distribution
This marine species occurs in deep water off the Philippines, Japan and Southeast Africa.

References

 Geiger D.L. (2006). Eight new species of Scissurellidae and Anatomidae (Mollusca: Gastropoda: Vetigastropoda) from around the world, with discussion of two senior synonyms. Zootaxa 1128:1-33
 Geiger D.L. (2012) Monograph of the little slit shells. Volume 1. Introduction, Scissurellidae. pp. 1-728. Volume 2. Anatomidae, Larocheidae, Depressizonidae, Sutilizonidae, Temnocinclidae. pp. 729–1291. Santa Barbara Museum of Natural History Monographs Number 7.

External links
 To Encyclopedia of Life
 To World Register of Marine Species
 

Anatomidae
Gastropods described in 1862